Tod or TOD may refer to:

People and fictional characters
 Tod (given name), a list of people and fictional characters with the given name or nickname
 Tod (surname), a list of people and a fictional character with the name
 Tod Andrews, American actor Theodore Edwin Anderson (1914–1972)
 Tod Browning, stage name of American film director, film actor, screenwriter, vaudeville performer and carnival sideshow and circus entertainer Charles Albert Browning Jr. (1880–1962)
 Tod Morgan, American boxer Albert Morgan Pilkington (1902–1953)
 Tod Robbins, a pen name of American mystery and horror author Clarence Aaron Robbins (1888–1949)
 Tod Slaughter, stage name of English actor Norman Carter Slaughter (1885–1956)
 ToD, French former professional Warcraft III and Starcraft II player Yoan Merlo (born 1985)
 Tod., taxonomic author abbreviation of Agostino Todaro (1818–1892), Italian botanist

Places
 Mount Tod, near British Columbia, Canada
 Mount Tod (Antarctica), near Amundsen Bay
 Tod, informal name for Todmorden, a town in Yorkshire, England
 Tod Reservoir, Eyre Peninsula, South Australia
 Tod River, Eyre Peninsula, South Australia

Transportation codes
 Tioman Airport IATA airport code
 Todmorden railway station, West Yorkshire, England, National Rail station code

TOD
 Top of descent, an aviation term
 Torque-on-Demand, trade name for a vehicle four wheel drive system
 Total Overdose, a 2005 video game
 CZW Tournament of Death, annual professional wrestling event
 Transit-oriented development, a form of land use planning
 Foresters' Association of Turkey (Türkiye Ormancılar Derneği)

Other uses
 TOD (video format), a digital video format by JVC
 Tod, a male fox
 Tod (unit), an English unit of weight

See also 
 Tod's, an Italian company which produces luxury shoes and other leather goods
 El-Tod, a village and archaeological site in Egypt
 Todd (disambiguation)